Six Companies, Inc. was a joint venture of construction companies that was formed to build the Hoover Dam on the Colorado River in Nevada and Arizona.

They later built Parker Dam, a portion of the Grand Coulee Dam, the Colorado River Aqueduct across the Mojave and Colorado Deserts to urban Southern California, and many other large projects.

Hoover Dam 
On January 10, 1932, the Bureau of Reclamation made bid documents for the Hoover Dam construction project available to interested parties at $5 a copy (equivalent to $ in ). The government would provide the materials, and the contractor was to prepare the site and build the dam. The dam was described in minute detail, covering 100 pages of text and 76 drawings. A $2 million (equivalent to $ in ) bid bond was to accompany each bid. The winner would have to post a $5 million (equivalent to $ in ) performance bond. The contractor would have seven years to build the dam, or penalties would ensue.

Because of the project's immense size and the fact that it was the first dam on the Colorado River, no single contractor had the resources to make a qualified bid alone. So, general contractors Utah Construction Company of Ogden, Utah decided to form a consortium in order to submit a joint bid for the contract. Initially, Utah Construction Company's owners, brothers E.O. and W.H. Wattis, along with the company's vice president, Andrew H. Christensen, asked Harry W. Morrison of Morrison-Knudsen to join them. After they realized the bid would be much higher than expected, the Wattis Brothers and Morrison-Knudsen convinced four additional companies to join. In February 1930 The Six Companies, Inc. was incorporated as a joint venture and they began working out a bid enlisting the help of Morrison-Knudsen employee Frank T. Crowe to do so.

The project was so complex and large that only three bids were received and, on March 4, 1931, the US Secretary of the Interior accepted the Six Companies' bid of US$48,890,955 (equivalent to $ in ). This was $5,000,000 lower than the next bidder, meaning a bid-spread of almost 10%.

The Six Companies board selected Crowe, who had helped draft the bid, as the General Construction Superintendent of the Boulder Dam construction. He was heavily involved and hired each of the men who were employed during the course of the project, lived in Boulder City with his wife and two daughters, and was on the dam site every day of the week until the project was completed.

Work began around June 1931 and The Six Companies completed the dam's construction two years ahead of schedule in 1935. Crowe was awarded a bonus percentage of the profit for completing virtually every portion of the job well ahead of schedule. The dam was dedicated in September 1935 but it took an additional nine years (1938–1947) under relative secrecy, to fix serious leaks with a supplemental grout curtain.

Six Companies Railroad 
The Six Companies also built the  Six Companies Railroad. It ran along the Hemenway Wash, present day Las Vegas Bay, and connected to the US Government Hoover Dam Railroad at Lawler, Nevada, a location also known as "US Government Junction". From the gravel plant the line split into two branches.

The line was constructed by railroad contractor John Phillips of San Francisco, California. Since the completion of the dam and filling of Lake Mead, Six Companies, Inc. railroad line is now submerged.

The Western Pacific Railroad purchased several of the Six Companies dump cars for company service after the dam was completed and the equipment declared surplus. One of these cars is now preserved at the Western Pacific Railroad Museum at Portola, California.

The US Government Railroad had a  branch that brought supplies by rail from a connection with the Boulder City Branch of the Union Pacific Railroad at Boulder City, Nevada.

WWII 
During World War II, the Six Companies built airstrips and related facilities on Pacific islands. The venture also held a majority ownership interest in Joshua Hendy Iron Works in Sunnyvale, California. Hendy was most known for its record-breaking assembly line production of 754 Liberty Ship EC-2 Reciprocating Steam Engines, producing one engine every 40.8 hours. They were used at the Richmond Shipyards.

Company structure 

Six Companies Inc. was composed of:
Henry J. Kaiser Co. of Oakland, California and Bechtel Corporation of San Francisco (as Bechtel-Kaiser): 30%
MacDonald and Kahn of Los Angeles, California: 20%
Utah Construction Company of Ogden, Utah: 20%
Morrison-Knudsen of Boise, Idaho: 10%,
Pacific Bridge Company of Portland, Oregon: 10%
J.F. Shea Co of Portland, Oregon: 10%

Leadership was split between the companies with officers:
 W.H. Wattis of Utah Construction Company (President)
 W.A. Bechtel of Bechtel-Kaiser (First Vice President)
 E.O. Wattis of Utah Construction Company (2nd Vice President)
 Charles A Shea of J.F. Shea Co (Secretary)
 Felix Kahn of MacDonald and Kahn (Treasurer)
 K.K. Bechtel of Bechtel-Kaiser (Assistant Secretary-Treasurer)

Board members included:
 W.H. Wattis
 E.O. Wattis
 Charles A. Shea
 Felix Kahn
 Stephen D. Bechtel
 Henry J. Kaiser
 Alan MacDonald
 Philip Hart

See also 
Grand Coulee Dam
Parker Dam

References

Further reading 
 Six Companies, Now Single Unit, Ready to Sign Contract for Hoover Dam; newspaper article; unknown date.

 
 

Colorado River
Construction and civil engineering companies established in 1931
Construction and civil engineering companies of the United States
Bechtel
Water and politics
American companies established in 1931